Food-Away-From-Home (FAFH) covers meals and snacks supplied by commercial food service establishments and by eating facilities in non commercial institutions.

Segments covered in FAFH

Commercial Foodservice
 Limited service restaurants: quick service restaurants, quick casual dining, cafeteria, delivery and take-away, and buffet
 Full-service restaurants: family style restaurants, casual dining, upscale casual dining and fine dining restaurants
 Drinking place: bars & taverns
 Lodging: hotels, motels, bed & breakfasts, etc.
 Retail stores (including vending machine sales),
 Recreational places (i.e. movie theaters, bowling alleys, pool parlors, sports arenas, amusement parks, camps, golf and country clubs).

Non commercial Foodservice
 Schools and colleges
 Healthcare & hospitals
 Business & industry: employees feeding in offices, factories, and plants
 And all other places (i.e. military exchanges and clubs, railroad dining cars, airlines, institutions, hospitals, boarding houses, fraternity and sorority houses, and civic and social organizations, and food facilities for military forces, civilian employees, and child day care).

References
 
 United States Department of Agriculture: U.S. Trends in Eating Away From Home - J. C. Durnagan, J. W. Hackett
 United States Department of Agriculture: The Demand for Food Away From Home: Full-Service or Fast Food? - H. Stewart, N. Blisard, S. Bhuyan, R. M. Nayga Jr.

External links
Online Ordering System for Restaurants

Foodservice